Spray Valley Provincial Park is a provincial park located east of the Rocky Mountains, along the Spray River in western Alberta, Canada.

The park is part of the Kananaskis Country park system (along with Bluerock Wildland Provincial Park, Bow Valley Provincial Park, Bow Valley Wildland Provincial Park, Canmore Nordic Centre Provincial Park, Don Getty Wildland Provincial Park, Elbow-Sheep Wildland Provincial Park, Peter Lougheed Provincial Park, Plateau Mountain Ecological Reserve, Sheep River Provincial Park and numerous designated provincial recreational areas). Spray Valley borders the Banff National Park to the west.

Spray Valley Provincial Park falls under the jurisdiction of Alberta Tourism, Parks and Recreation, and on-site management is delegated to Kananaskis Country Campgrounds

History 
Spray Valley mountains, Mount Shark and Mount Sparrowhawk were designated as sites to host alpine skiing events in Calgary's bid for the 1988 Winter Olympics, however, the venue for the alpine skiing events moved to Nakiska shortly after Calgary was awarded the Games.

Activities
Spray Valley Provincial Park is easily accessible by road (the Bighorn Highway), and provides a setting for low impact activities such as hiking and cross-country skiing. Camping is permitted in summer (from May 17 to October 9) at the Lillian Lake, Ribbon Falls, Ribbon Lake, Eau Claire and Spray Lakes West campgrounds, and in winter at the Buller Mountain and Eau Claire campgrounds. Several day use areas are open for public in summer (with two areas, Sparrowhawk and Mount Shark, available year round).

Other recreational activities include canoeing, kayaking, fishing for trout and ice fishing.

Conservation
A management plan approved in March 2003 by the Kananaskis Country restricts further development in the park area, in order to preserve the ecological integrity. Restrictions were imposed on off-road vehicles, snowmobiles, horseback riding and biking, however a site in the Spray Valley is considered for the construction of a small lodge.

See also
List of provincial parks in Alberta
List of Canadian provincial parks
List of National Parks of Canada

References

External links
 Alberta Community Development. Official Park webpage

Provincial parks of Alberta
Parks in the Canadian Rockies
Kananaskis Improvement District